Rouge River or River Rouge may refer to rivers or places:

Canada:
Rouge River (Ontario), a river in Toronto
Scarborough—Rouge River, an electoral district named after the river
Rouge River (Laurentides), a tributary of the Ottawa River in western Quebec
Rivière-Rouge, a city named after the river
Rivière-Rouge Ecological Reserve, a protected area located in the Rivière Rouge region (Laurentides) of Quebec
Rouge River (Beaurivage River tributary), Quebec
Rouge River (Montmorency River tributary), in the Capitale-Nationale administrative region, Quebec
Rouge River East, in the Capitale-Nationale administrative region, Quebec

United States:
River Rouge (Michigan), a river in southeast Michigan
River Rouge, Michigan, a city named after the river
Ford River Rouge Complex, the giant Ford auto plant located on the river

Other places:
 Eau Rouge (Red Water), a stream in Belgium

See also
Red River (disambiguation)
Rogue River (disambiguation)
Rouge (disambiguation)